Kauslunde is a town located on the island of Funen in south Denmark, in Middelfart Municipality.

References 

Cities and towns in the Region of Southern Denmark
Middelfart Municipality